An Introduction to Language is a textbook by Victoria Fromkin, Robert Rodman, and Nina Hyams in which the authors provide an introduction to linguistics.

Reception
The book was reviewed by Judith W. Lindfors, Adam Glaz and Geoffrey Horrocks.
Peter Ladefoged calls it a "successful book" whose success lies in its clarity and the wide range of topics covered.

References

External links 
 An Introduction to Language

1974 non-fiction books
Linguistics textbooks